Ingleton may refer to:
 Ingleton, County Durham
 Ingleton, North Yorkshire